Yevgeni Viktorovich Markov (born 1 July 1978) is a former Russian professional football player.

Club career
He played 8 seasons in the Russian Football National League for 4 different teams.

References

External links
 

1978 births
Living people
Russian footballers
Association football defenders
FC Baltika Kaliningrad players
FC Metallurg Lipetsk players
FC Vityaz Podolsk players
FC Zvezda Irkutsk players
FC Kristall Smolensk players
FC Novokuznetsk players